A Man Called Magnum (in original Italian Napoli si ribella) is a 1977 poliziotteschi film. This film by Michele Massimo Tarantini stars Luc Merenda.

Plot

Cast
Luc Merenda: commissario Dario Mauri
Enzo Cannavale: maresciallo Nicola Capece
Claudio Gora: Don Domenico Laurenzi 
Giancarlo Badessi: Avv. Cerullo
Nando Murolo: Bonino 
Nello Pazzafini

Releases
The film released on Region 1 DVD by NoShame films in 2006. The DVD is currently out-of-print.

References

External links

1977 films
1970s Italian-language films

1970s action thriller films
Poliziotteschi films
1970s crime thriller films
Films directed by Michele Massimo Tarantini
1970s Italian films